This article attempts to list the oldest extant buildings surviving in the state of South Carolina in the United States of America, including the oldest houses in South Carolina and any other surviving structures. Some dates are approximate and based upon dendochronology, architectural studies, and historical records. Many sites on this list are considered American colonial architecture that date to the period before the American Revolutionary War.
To be listed here a site must:
 date from prior to 1776; or
 be the oldest building in a town, city, or county; or
 be the oldest of its type (e.g., church or government building).

See also
 Oldest buildings in the United States
 Oldest churches in the United States
 National Register of Historic Places listings in South Carolina

References

South Carolina
Architecture in South Carolina
Oldest